Sapphire Retail is a Pakistani high-street clothing retailer which sells ready-to-wear, unstitched and haute couture. It is whole-owned subsidiary of public limited company Sapphire Textile. 

The retailer is based in Lahore, Pakistan.

Stores
Sapphire has stores in following cities:

Sindh
 Karachi
 Hyderabad

Punjab
 Lahore
 Islamabad
 Rawalpindi
 Faisalabad
 Multan
 Sialkot
 Gujranwala
 Bahawalpur
 Mandi Bahauddin
 Sheikhupura
 Gujrat

Khyber Paktunkhwa
 Abbottabad
 Swat
 Peshawer

Design studio
Director
 Kalsoom Nabeel
Designers
 Sania maskatia 2014
 Khadijah shah 2014-2017
 Mahgul 2017-2018
 Bilal Ashraf 2018-till date
 Aleena Ahmad 2019-2021
 Rehan Bashir 2022-till date
Visual Merchandisers
 Belal Baig 2019-till date
 Chaudhary Salman 2021-till date

Concepts
Sapphire 

Unstiched: Unstitched consists of unstitched cloth that can be stitched by women.

Ready to Wear:  Ready-To-Wear consists of Eastern and Western wear catering to everyday and formal occasions.

Accessories: Accessories consists of a wide range of accessories from bags, shoes, sunglasses, hair accessories, jewelry, and intimates. 

Fragrances: Fragrances (men and women) consists of perfumes, hair and body mists.

Home: Home consists of assortments ranging from bed linens to crockery table linen and cushions. 

Man: Man consists of unstitched cloth that can be stitched by men.

References

Clothing brands of Pakistan
Clothing companies of Pakistan
Companies based in Lahore
Clothing retailers of Pakistan
2014 establishments in Pakistan
Retail companies established in 2014